Pyrellia is a genus from the fly family Muscidae.

Species List
Pyrellia acaciae Pont & Baldock, 2007
Pyrellia albocuprea Villeneuve, 1914
Pyrellia ampullacea Couri, Pont & Penny, 2006
Pyrellia attonita Pont, 1973
Pyrellia basalis Walker
Pyrellia cadaverina (Linnaeus, 1758)
Pyrellia difficilis Zielke, 1971
Pyrellia flavicornis Macquart
Pyrellia habaheensis Fan & Qian, 1992
P. ignita Robineau-Desvoidy, 1830
Pyrellia keiseri Zielke, 1972
Pyrellia kuhlowi Zielke, 1971
Pyrellia maculipennis Macquart, 1851
Pyrellia minuta Zimin, 1951
Pyrellia natalensis Paterson, 1958
Pyrellia neuhausi Zielke, 1971
Pyrellia ochricornis Wiedemann
Pyrellia ponti Shinonaga & Tumrasvin, 1978
Pyrellia proferens (Walker, 1859)
Pyrellia purpureonitens Emden, 1965
P. rapax (Harris, 1780)
Pyrellia schumanni Zielke, 1971
Pyrellia scintillans Bigot, 1888
P. secunda Zimin, 1951
Pyrellia spinthera Bigot, 1878
Pyrellia stuckenbergi Paterson, 1957
Pyrellia suchariti Shinonaga & Tumrasvin, 1978
Pyrellia tasmaniae Macquart, 1846
Pyrellia viridissima Meunier, 1908
P. vivida Robineau-Desvoidy, 1830
Pyrellia wittei Zielke, 1971

References

Muscidae
Diptera of Europe
Articles containing video clips
Brachycera genera
Taxa named by Jean-Baptiste Robineau-Desvoidy